The Coppa Florio (or Florio Cup) was a motorsport race for automobiles first held in Italy in 1900. It was renamed in 1905 when Vincenzo Florio offered the initial 50,000 Lira prize money and a cup designed by Polak of Paris.  The cup was to be awarded to the car maker who gained the most wins in the first seven races, beginning with the race held in 1905.
In the event, the first seven races were all won by different manufacturers, but Peugeot won the eighth race in 1925 and thus secured the cup with its second win. However, the competition for the cup continued after Lucien Rosengart, then a director of Peugeot, offered to make it available again.

The Brescia race ran along the route  Brescia-Cremona-Mantua-Brescia.
In 1908, the race used the Circuito di Bologna: Bologna-Castelfranco Emilia-Sant'Agata Bolognese-San Giovanni in Persiceto-Bologna.
After 1914, most of the Coppa Florio races were co-organized with the Targa Florio at the Circuito delle Madonie circuit outside Palermo, Sicily, running four or five laps, 108 km each.
Only in 1927 did the race move to Saint-Brieuc, in honour of Peugeot's second win in 1925. The race attracted teams from around Europe as well as the 1921 Grand Prix Sunbeams from England  and was an opportunity to see Sir Henry Segrave and Jean Chassagne competing. The winners were:

From 1974, the Coppa Florio was revived as a sports car race held at the Autodromo di Pergusa in Sicily. The race counted towards the World Sportscar Championship most years from 1975, last being held in 1981. In 2020, the Coppa Florio was again revived at Pergusa, being the fifth round of the 2020 24H GT and TCE Series as the Coppa Florio 12 Hours of Sicily. The race was again confirmed as part of the 24H Series calendar, of 2021, being the seventh round of 8 events scheduled for the 2 and 3 of October, but was later cancelled.

Past winners

Winners of revived race 
The following is a list of winners of the revived race held at Pergusa:

References

Auto races in Italy
Florio family
24H Series
Sports car races
Touring car races
Endurance motor racing